Ryuga-ike is an earthfill dam located in Yamanashi Prefecture in Japan. The dam is used for irrigation. The catchment area of the dam is  km2. The dam impounds about 3  ha of land when full and can store 264 thousand cubic meters of water. The construction of the dam was completed in 1956.

References

Dams in Yamanashi Prefecture
1956 establishments in Japan